Pleuretra is a genus of rotifers belonging to the family Philodinidae.

The species of this genus are found in North America.

Species:

Pleuretra africana 
Pleuretra alpium 
Pleuretra bovicornis 
Pleuretra brycei 
Pleuretra costata 
Pleuretra humerosa 
Pleuretra hystrix 
Pleuretra intermedia 
Pleuretra lineata 
Pleuretra proxima 
Pleuretra reticulata 
Pleuretra similis 
Pleuretra sulcata 
Pleuretra triangularis

References

Rotifers